Temel is a Turkish given name for males. People named Temel include:

 Hikmet Temel Akarsu (born 1960), Turkish novelist, short-story writer, satirist and playwright
 Temel Kotil (born 1959), Turkish aeronautical engineer 

Turkish masculine given names